Pere Ubu is an American rock group formed in Cleveland, Ohio, in 1975. The band had a variety of long-term and recurring band members, with singer David Thomas being the only member staying throughout the band's lifetime. They released their debut album The Modern Dance in 1978 and followed with several more LPs before disbanding in 1982. Thomas reformed the group in 1987, continuing to record and tour.

Describing their sound as "avant-garage," Pere Ubu's work drew inspiration from sources such as musique concrète, 60s rock, performance art, and the industrial environments of the American Midwest. While the band achieved little commercial success, they have exerted a wide influence on subsequent underground music.

History

1970s
Rocket from the Tombs was a Cleveland-based group that eventually fragmented: some members formed the Dead Boys, and others The Saucers, while David Thomas and guitarist Peter Laughner joined with guitarist Tom Herman, bass guitarist Tim Wright, drummer Scott Krauss and synthesist Allen Ravenstine to form Pere Ubu in 1975.  At the time the band formed, Herman, Krauss, and Ravenstine lived in a house owned by Ravenstine. The group's name is a reference to Ubu Roi, an avant-garde play by French writer Alfred Jarry.

Pere Ubu's debut single (their first four records were singles on their own "Hearpen" label) was "30 Seconds Over Tokyo" (inspired by the "Doolittle Raid" and named after a film depicting the raid), backed with "Heart of Darkness"; followed by "Final Solution" in 1976. One review noted that "30 Seconds" "was clearly the work of a garage band, yet its arty dissonance and weird experimentalism were startlingly unique."
Laughner left the group after their first two singles, and died soon afterwards of acute pancreatic failure.

Other recordings of the 1970s
"Street Waves" b/w "My Dark Ages (I Don't Get Around)" was their third single, and after their fourth single, "The Modern Dance" b/w 'Heaven" (which was pressed in very small quantities and contained a completely different mix of "Modern Dance" from the album version), Pere Ubu signed to Blank Records, a short-lived imprint of Mercury Records.

Tony Maimone signed on as bassist after Tim Wright left to join DNA.

Their debut album, The Modern Dance (1978), sold poorly, but has proven influential. Musicians of many types, including progressive rock, punk rock, post punk and new wave, were influenced by the dark, abstract record. With the song "Sentimental Journey," the debut also introduced the practice of re-appropriating titles from well-known popular songs: Pere Ubu's "Sentimental Journey" has no obvious relation to the Doris Day hit song of the same name; "Drinking Wine Spodyody" has no apparent connection to the Sticks McGhee song (later revived by Jerry Lee Lewis). This practice has continued through 2006's Why I Hate Women, which has a song called "Blue Velvet" (again, no relation to the 1963 hit song by Bobby Vinton).

While most synthesizer players tended to play the instrument as they would a piano or organ, Ravenstine generally opted instead to make sounds that were reminiscent of spooky sound effects from 1950s science fiction films, or perhaps electronic music and musique concrète. One critic writes that Ravenstine "may be one of the all-time great synth players" and his playing has been called "utterly original".

Pere Ubu's second and third albums, Dub Housing and New Picnic Time, followed with much the same reaction.

The group briefly disbanded in 1979, but reformed soon afterwards with Herman replaced by Mayo Thompson (of Red Krayola).

1980s
The Art of Walking (1980) featured Thompson on guitar. For the next original album, Song of the Bailing Man (1982), Krauss was replaced by Anton Fier.

The group disbanded again soon afterwards; Krauss and Maimone formed Home and Garden, while Thomas worked on a solo career, notably with Richard Thompson and with members of Henry Cow.

By the late 1980s, one of Thomas's solo projects eventually featured much of Pere Ubu. The band was reformed again in 1987, with Jim Jones and Chris Cutler joining for the release of The Tenement Year (1988), a far more pop-oriented album than ever before. The following year, "Waiting for Mary" (off Cloudland) appeared on MTV briefly. After the recording of Cloudland, Ravenstine left the group (although he made a guest appearance on Worlds in Collision) and later became an airline pilot. Eric Drew Feldman joined the band in time for the Cloudland tour and the recording of Worlds in Collision, but left afterwards, joining Frank Black.

1990s

In 1993, Story of My Life was released. Maimone left (once again) to join They Might Be Giants, and Michele Temple and Garo Yellin joined the band for the Story of My Life tour and feature on Ubu's 1995 album, Ray Gun Suitcase. Robert Wheeler has played synthesizer and theremin with Pere Ubu since 1994. Krauss left the band during the Ray Gun Suitcase sessions. For the Ray Gun Suitcase tour, guitarist Jim Jones departed as a touring member (although he continued to contribute to recordings), founding guitarist Tom Herman replaced him for the tour.

Concurrent with the 1996 release of the Datapanik in Year Zero box set, Jim Jones retired due to health problems. Tom Herman returned to the band after a twenty-year absence to tour with the band in 1995, and went on to record Pennsylvania (1998), which also featured guitar contributions from Jim Jones. Guitarist Wayne Kramer of MC5 fame joined the band for their 1998 summer tour.

2000–2010
While much of 2000 was given over to live performances by Thomas's side projects - David Thomas and Two Pale Boys (Andy Diagram and Keith Moliné) and The Pale Orchestra -  Pere Ubu played a gig bannered '55 Years of Pain' in June at the Cleveland Rock and Roll Hall of Fame alongside 15-60-75. The band then teamed up in September 2000 with special guest Wayne Kramer for another performance of '55 Years of Pain'. This time at the Royal Festival Hall, Southbank, London.

Although Pere Ubu took a break from touring in 2001, they worked on material for a new album. Thomas also devoted himself for much of the year to live performance. This included his theatrical project 'Mirror Man (A Geography of Sound in Two Acts)' as well as an extensive David Thomas and Two Pale Boys European and US tour. In February, The trio were also asked to support Goth band the Sisters of Mercy at five concerts in England. Founding member Andrew Eldritch had long cited Pere Ubu and David Thomas as a key musical influence.Speaking in 2016, Eldritch said: "I remember seeing the best gig I ever saw in my life which was Pere Ubu supported by the Human League on the tiny stage of the F Club in Leeds [Dec 7 1978]."

St. Arkansas was released on 20 May 2002 on Glitterhouse Records. The group comprised David Thomas, Tom Herman, Robert Wheeler, Michele Temple and Steve Mehlman. Jim Jones again contributed guitar parts. In September 2002 the band undertook the 11 date 'Mighty Road Tour in American and Canada. Tom Herman left again in late 2002, being replaced by Keith Moliné from David Thomas and Two Pale Boys. That same year, Thomas and Moliné were joined by Robert Wheeler, Michele Temple and Chris Cutler. They performed a live soundtrack to a 3-D screening of 'It Came from Outer Space' at the Royal Festival Hall, London on October 9, 2002. This performance direction reflected a formative influence on Pere Ubu and Thomas's long-held affection for B-Movies. 2002 was also marked by an officially release, on Feb 1,  of Rocket From the Tombs' recordings on Smog Veil Records. While bootlegs of varying quality had long circulated The Day The Earth Met The Rockets From the Tombs''' drew on original rehearsal and concert masters from 1974.

Pere Ubu's 'Mighty Road' tour resumed in February 2003 with 10 dates in the US. 2003 was also notable for performances in the summer and winter across the US and Canada by a revived Rocket From The Tombs. The band comprised David Thomas, Cheetah Chrome, Craig Bell, Richard Lloyd and Steve Mehlman. Of the 33 dates, one at the Beachland Ballroom in Cleveland was a benefit for an increasingly ill Jim Jones. Richard Lloyd recorded and engineered live in the studio performances of the original Rockets' songs. Originally, 'Rocket Redux' was sold as gig-only merchandise until it was commercially released the following year by Smog Veil Records.

Live film accompaniment came to the fore again for Pere Ubu in 2004. Firstly, the group premiered its underscore to Roger Corman's 'X, the Man With X-Ray Eyes' at the 'Celebrate Brooklyn' festival on 22 July. The winter of that year also saw a UK tour that revived the band's live underscoring of 'It Came from Outer Space'. American music producer Hal Willner also invited David Thomas to join two shows. The first took place on April 1 in Los Angeles,  'Let's Eat - Feasting on The Firesign Theatre',  a celebration of the anarchic comedy outfit of that name. The cast included George Wendt, John Goodman, Todd Rundgren, Chloe Webb and Loudon Wainwright among others.

Just over three weeks later Thomas, partnered by the Paleboys,  joined Hal Willner's tribute to director Federico Fellini and composer Nino Rota. 'Perfect Partners' took place at London's Barbican Theatre and the production also featured Carla Bley, Roy Nathanson, Roger Eno, Kate St John, Beth Orton and Geri Allen. 2004 also saw Pere Ubu support Spiritualized at London's Royal Festival Hall on 1 August, Rocket From The Tombs played Kassel in Germany on 25 September and David Thomas and Two Pale Boys performed extensively in Europe and America with the release in April of 18 Monkeys On A Dead Man's Chest (Smog Veil Records and Glitterhouse Records).

During the spring, Fall and winter of 2005, Pere Ubu toured a show dubbed 'Live Free or Diet'  as well as other concerts across America and Europe. Additionally, the band performed their live underscore to screenings of Roger Corman's 'X, the Man With X-Ray Eyes: April 9 at the Byrd Theatre, Richmond Virginia;  August 12 at the Museum of Contemporary Art in North Adams, Massachusetts and November 5 at the Regent Square Theater in Pittsburgh.

2005 also saw David Thomas join Wayne Kramer and the newly monikered DKT-MC5 as well as the Sun Ra Arkestra on 25 February at the Royal Festival Hall London. When Patti Smith organised the 'Meltdown Festival' in June at the Royal Festival Hall, London she invited Thomas to take part. He sang, with accompaniment from the London Sinfonietta, Bertolt Brecht and Kurt Weill's 'Alabama Song'.And, as was now becoming customary when the band was not on the road, Pere Ubu guitarist Keith Moliné joined David Thomas with trumpeter Andy Diagram for a series of improvisational gigs across Europe.

From May until the end of 2006 Pere Ubu gigged in Europe and America. On October 29 at the Royce Hall, Los Angeles, the group delivered a double bill consisting of that year's concert set and their live underscore to a screening of Roger Corman's 'X, the Man With X-Ray Eyes. There was also a nine date Rocket from the Tombs American tour in the summer and Fall.

On 19 September 2006 Pere Ubu released Why I Hate Women on Smog Veil Records. The band was Thomas,  Moliné, Wheeler, Temple and Mehlan with contributions from Robert and Jack Kidney, Rodolphe Burger and Andy Diagram. Thomas had teamed up with Burger earlier in the summer for four dates in France. In October, Smog Veil Records and Glitterhouse Records issued Why I Remix Women a set of band reworkings of the original tracks by Thomas, Moliné and Temple. Gagarin, an electronica instrumentalist and drummer for Nico during the 1980s, had worked for several years as live sound man for Pere Ubu as well as providing occasional on-stage contributions . His remix of 'Blue Velvet' was included on the album.

In the spring of 2007, Pere Ubu hit the road once more, with six dates in America,  20 in Europe and followed in the Fall with four shows in the US and Canada. Work also started in 2007 on adapting, for performance, Alfred Jarry's 'Ubu Roi', the play that had inspired the band's name.

In December 2007, the download site Hearpen.com was launched providing live recordings and hard-to-source material by Pere Ubu and related acts.

During February and March 2008 Pere Ubu toured Europe and America. This included two live underscorings of Roger Corman's 'X, the Man With X-Ray Eyes: March 24 at the Neighborhood Theater, Charlotte, North Carolina and March 25 at the Plaza Theater, Atlanta, Georgia.

On February 18, 2008, Jim Jones, former guitarist, associate of the band from its earliest days and US manager for many years of the group's online store, died at his Cleveland residence.

On April 24, 2008, the Ether festival at London's South Bank Centre hosted the world premiere of Bring Me The Head of Ubu Roi.  This adaptation by David Thomas of Alfred Jarry's play Ubu Roi was accompanied by animations by the Brothers Quay. The production featured David Thomas as Pere Ubu and Sarah Jane Morris as Mere Ubu with the rest of the band playing various roles.

Back in 2006 musical producer Hal Willner had gathered together a host of musicians and actors for a double CD Rogue's Gallery: Pirate Ballads, Sea Songs, and Chanteys. In the summer of 2008, Willner brought a three date live show of the work to the UK and Ireland. David Thomas who had contributed versions of 'Dan Dan' and 'The Drunken Sailor' to the album joined the cast along with Pere Ubu guitarist Keith Moliné for all performances.

In 2009, Bring Me The Head of Ubu Roi was staged once again; this time at the Animator Festival, Poznań, Poland on July 11. The band's new album, Long Live Père Ubu!, released September 14 on Cooking Vinyl Records with the American release issued on Hearpen Records. The disc reprised the Ubu Roi story. Sarah Jane Morris guested on the disc as did Ubu's sound man Gagarin. The rest of the band comprised: Thomas, Moliné, Wheeler, Temple and Mehlman. During the Fall and winter the group toured extensively in Europe including material from the new album.

From February 2010, the band continued to tour the new album in the United Kingdom under the banner 'Long Live Père Ubu! - The Spectacle'. The concert show also had its American premerie on 28 March in New York. The band also performed debut album The Modern Dance in its entirety, firstly, at the Cleveland Beachland Ballroom, March 5 then on March 24 at Chicago's Lincoln Hall.

David Thomas once more joined the cast of Hal Willner's live show Rogue's Gallery: Pirate Ballads, Sea Songs, and Chanteys. Thomas followed that show at the Sydney Opera House, Australia on January 28 with a concert of Pere Ubu songs, again in Sydney, on January 31 where he was backed by local band The Holy Soul. Thomas also revived his spoken word set 'the Ghost Line Diaries', originally aired at the 14th Genoa International Poetry Festival, Genoa, Italy, on June 19, 2008. Three gigs took place: Copenhagen, Denmark on October 9; Boston, USA on October 23 and in Geneva, Switzerland on December 5.

2011–2020
On March 19, 2011, Tom Herman, guitarist from the first Pere Ubu line up joined the band for a show at The Beachland Ballroom, Cleveland. The set included a full performance of 'The Modern Dance' album. Between March and August the group played a further 18 shows in Europe incorporating The Modern Dance in a number of them. In April, David Thomas joined fellow Rocket From the Tombs musician Cheetah Chrome for the 'Cleveland Confidential Book Tour': April 11, Cleveland Rock and Roll Hall of Fame and Museum; and April 14, The Grammy Museum, Los Angeles. A new Rocket from the Tombs album, 'Barfly'  appeared in September on Fire Records and Smog Veil Records. The band was: David Thomas; Cheetah Chrome; Craig Bell; Richard Lloyd and Steve Mehlman and they played seven dates in the USA throughout December.

David Thomas and Two Pale Boys debuted the project at Cafe Oto, London on February 12, followed by further performances at Cinéma L'Univers, Lille, France (June 4) and the Duke of York's Picture, Brighton, England (December 2).

David Thomas and The Two Pale Boys were invited once more (as in February 2001) to support the Sisters of Mercy, this time playing at the Goth band's 30th anniversary gig in their home town of Leeds, February 2011.

While work started on a new Pere Ubu album in 2012 - tracks in progress appearing on the band's website 'Ubu Projex' throughout the year -  there were no live performances by the band. A scheduled 16-date Rocket From the Tombs tour in May 2012 was disrupted when David Thomas fell ill. The first eight gigs in Europe were cancelled, six took place before Thomas became ill again resulting in the cancellation of the final two dates. However, the band played five gigs in America and Canada in October of that year.

In 2012, Thomas published 'The Book of Hieroglyphs', in which he ruminated on America and the nature of being an American. The book drew on lyrics from Pere Ubu, The Two Pale Boys and other Thomas works, supplemented by a number of essays.

The Pere Ubu long player Lady from Shanghai was released, January 7, 2013, on Fire Records. Its title referenced 'The Lady from Shanghai', a film noir made in 1947 by Orson Welles. The band comprised David Thomas; Keith Moliné; Michele Temple; Robert Wheeler; Steve Mehlman and Gagarin. Clarinettist Darryl Boon guested on the disc. A book, 'Chinese Whispers The Making of Pere Ubu's 'Lady from Shanghai', was published at the same time. This included an account of the creation of the album modelled on the parlour game Chinese Whispers.

On February 17, 2013, Pere Ubu performed the 'Modern Dance' album in full at the 'I'll Be Your Mirror' festival in Melbourne, Australia. A production of Bring Me The Head of Ubu Roi: Chamber Version' aired on March 8 in Lodz, Poland. This small cast version of the play featured Thomas, Gagarin, Malgosia Sady and Kiersty Boon.

An 11-date Pere Ubu tour of England followed in April 2013. A further gig in London on June 16 launched a European tour in June and July. Then on July 13, as part of the East End Film Festival,  the band once more performed their live underscore to Carnival of Souls. In September, Pere Ubu played 17 dates in America and Canada. Protracted discussions with the US Customs and Immigration Service had preceded the tour but visas were denied to Keith Moliné and Gagarin. David Cintron guitarist with a number of Cleveland bands including the Terminal Lovers took Moliné's place. However, at a number of the shows Gagarin performed by video link from his studio in London.

Three dates followed in Europe during November before the band played several gigs in the UK and Ireland under the heading of the 'Visions of the Moon tour'. The set that featured some of the material that would appear on the Carnival of Souls album.

On August 4, 2013, Tim Wright, bassist in the original Pere Ubu line up, died at the age of 63.

Pere Ubu's first performance of 2014 was at the Sons d'hiver festival in Creteil, France on February 15. On September 8 Carnival of Souls was released on Fire Records. The album had its musical roots in the live accompaniment that both Pere Ubu and David Thomas and Two Pale Boys had performed for a number of years to screenings of the Herk Harvey B-movie of that name. The band comprised: David Thomas; Keith Moliné; Michele Temple; Robert Wheeler; Steve Mehlman; Gagarin;and Darryl Boon. As with 'Lady From Shanghai', a book was published to coincide with the new album. 'Cogs The Making of Carnival Of Souls' contained essays by David Thomas, commentary from the musicians and album lyrics.

On September 12, the Pere Ubu Fim Group (on this occasion Thomas, Keith Moliné, Gagarin and Darryl Boon) performed their live underscore to Carnival of Souls at the L'Étrange Festival, Forum des Images in Paris, France.

The band embarked on a 13 date UK tour in November 2013 with support from the Pere Ubu Moon Unit (consisting of Thomas and other members of the main band). The 12th gig was an underscoring to Roger Corman's 'X, The Man With X Ray Eyes' at the Brighton Film Festival on November 23. Between November 27 and December 6 the group played nine dates across mainland Europe. In 2015, Fire Records issued a mini-album of the Moon Unit's November 21 performance in Leeds, England.

From late January 2015 until the end of February, the group continued touring in Europe with material from Carnival of Souls with the Pere Ubu Moon Unit often providing support. Five dates in July in the UK were followed by a show at the New Horizons International Film Festival in Wroclaw, Poland on July 26. On August 21 Fire Records issued a four disc remastred vinyl box set, Elitism For the People 1975-1978. This comprised the Hearpen singles, The Modern Dance, Dub Housing and a live recording from 1977, made in New York at Max's Kansas City. A new Rocket from the Tombs disc Black Record appeared on November 21, again on Fire Records. The band was Thomas; Craig Bell; Gary Siperko; Buddy Akita; and Steve Mehlman with contributions from Akita's colleagues from This Moment In Black History: Lamont Thomas; Lawrence Caswell; and Chris Kulcsar.

Rocket From The Tombs played eight American dates in December 2015 followed by a show at the State-X New Forms Festival in Den Haag, Netherlands. After two appearances in England the band returned to Europe performing in Diksmuide, Belgium and at the Festival Les Aventuriers, in Paris on December 16.

On February 6, 2016, the Pere Ubu Film Unit delivered its live underscore once more to Carnival of Souls. This time, a dubbed in Spanish and colorized version of the film was screened at the Universitat Jaume I in Castelló de la Plana, Spain. Fire Records' release on March 18 of the second archival box set - Architecture of Language 1979-1982 (vinyl remasters of New Picnic Time, The Art of Walking, Song of the Bailing Man and Architectural Salvage a disc of live and alternate mixes) prompted a tour drawing on songs from 1975 to 1982. Tom Herman rejoined the touring band and selected the material for the set list.

The Coed Jail! debuted on March 22, 2016, at the Ruby Lounge in Manchester, England. It ran for most of the year - there was a break in the Fall - 43 dates in total in Europe, Canada and America ending on December 10 in the Casbah, San Diego, California. The name reprised the set of gigs that Pere Ubu performed in February 1978 alongside the Suicide Commandos. Johnny Dromette (John Thompson) record store manager, promoter, designer and housemate of Thomas, had coined the phrase for the game show set he had built over night in their living room. Dromette created the first posters for the band and designed the Datapanik in Year Zero ep cover He has often provided poster, tee-shirt and packaging design as well as video production work throughout Pere Ubu's career. His recollections of the time are shared in two interviews on Pere Ubu's own UbuDub podcast series.

Splinter group Pere Ubu (Moon Unit) also made three appearances in 2016, one in London (Aug 25 with support from David Thomas and Two Pale Boys) and two in France (Nantes, August 27 and Brest, November 19).

The final box sets in Fire Records' series of vinyl remasters appeared in the Spring of 2017. Les Haricots Sont Pas Salés 1987-1991, April 6, contained The Tenement Year, Cloudland, Worlds In Collision and Songs From the Lost Album. Drive, He Said 1994-2002 followed on May 26. It comprised Ray Gun Suitcase, Pennsylvania, St. Arkansas and Back Roads, a disc of outtakes and alternate mixes.

Rocket From the Tombs played the Beachland Tavern, Cleveland on May 11, 2017, and the Ace Of Cups in Columbus, Ohio on May 13. Both Rocket From the Tombs and Pere Ubu performed at the Austin Jukebox, a regular multi band show event, in Austin Texas, on May 19 and 20 respectively.

A repeat of the Coed Jail! set took place in Jarocin, Poland on July 15. The band on this occasion was: David Thomas; Gary Siperko; Robert Wheeler; Michele Temple; and Steve Mehlman. A recording of the concert would provide the bulk of the 2020 release, on Cherry Red Records, By Order of Mayor Pawlicki (Live in Jarocin). Pere Ubu (Moon Unit) played seven European dates in August and October.

At the end of September, Pere Ubu released 20 Years In A Montana Missile Silo on Cherry Red Records. The band was: David Thomas; Keith Molinè; Gary Siperko; Kristof Hahn (of The Swans); Darryl Boon; Robert Wheeler; Gagarin; Michele Temple; and Steve Mehlman. Welsh-Iranian artist Roshi Nasehi provided backing vocal to 'I Can Still See'.

The 'MonkeyNet Tour' in support of the new album, began in Pittsburgh, Pennsylvania on November 8, 2017. Thirteen more US performances took place before David Thomas became seriously ill resulting in the cancellation of seven concerts on the West Coast of America.

Marking their return to live performance in Spring 2018, Pere Ubu mounted the 'Grand Guignol' show at London's Borderline. A nine-piece band took to the stage on May 19: David Thomas;  Keith Moliné; Gary Siperko; Robert Wheeler; Gagarin; Michele Temple; Steve Mehlman; Darryl Boon; and Kristof Hahn. For the rest of May and start of June a more regular-sized band played 12 dates across Europe. The 'MonkeyNet Tour' then resumed with shows in New York (August 17) and Providence, Rhode Island (Aug 18). Five dates followed in September in Italy and one appearance in Tel Aviv (September 15).

Following the critical illness that had prematurely ended the original 'MonkeyNet' tour, Thomas initiated work, early in 2018, on a new Pere Ubu album. While still a work in progress by the end of the year, the plan was to include versions of three tracks at two Pere Ubu (Moon Unit) shows in December. As recounted in the sleeve notes that accompany The Long Goodbye, keyboardist Gagarin suggested, two days before the first gig, that the outfit perform the album in its entirety. The material aired on December 7 at the Music Hall in Ramsgate, England. The band comprised Thomas, Keith Moliné, Gagarin and Chris Cutler. The group repeated the set the following evening at the Théâtre Municipal Berthelot in Montreuil on the outskirts of Paris, a performance eventually issued as a companion disc to The Long Goodbye CD.

A few days after the Montreuil gig, David Thomas fell seriously ill again, was hospitalized and began a period of extensive recovery in 2019. However, The Long Goodbye was completed and released, July 12, on Cherry Red Records. The band was: David Thomas; Keith Moliné; Gagarin; Robert Wheeler;  Michele Temple; Darryl Boon; and P. O. Jørgens. Guitarist Gary Siperko also guested. Once more a book accompanied the new album. Baptized Into the Buzz contained information about the new album and the related 2017 record that Thomas had made with Danish percussionist P. O. Jørgens: Live Free or Die on Ninth World Music. There were lyrics to both releases, commentary from musicians and a short piece of family biography by Thomas.

Pere Ubu toured The Long Goodbye late in 2019. Seven dates, spread over September, October and November, that took in London, Ireland, Norway, the Netherlands, Belgium and Italy. The band began 2020 with a performance at the Centro Conde Duque Arts in Madrid. The day before, January 15, David Thomas ran a workshop, 'How To Be A Singer',  in partnership with the band's drummer Chris Cutler. However, further dates scheduled for 2020 were disrupted by the COVID-19 pandemic and ensuing lockdown.  In response, in May The Avant Garage Fan Attic (Official) launched on subscription platform Patreon. The exclusive content includes Datapanik TV (DPKTV), a channel of live broadcasts hosted by David Thomas.

2021–present
On February 11, 2022, the group played a one-off performance called "Pere Ubu's Canterbury Tales" at The University of Kent's Gulbenkain Theater in Canterbury. The group's line-up for this was show included Thomas, Moliné, Gagarin, Cutler and new member Alex Ward on guitar and clarinet. David Thomas and The Two Pale Boys (Moliné, Gagarin, and Andy Diagram for this performance) played an opening set, as did Rats On Rafts, who performed a live cover of Pere Ubu’s Visions Of The Moon. The show was emceed by Bob Holman of the Bowery Poetry Club in New York City.

A new vinyl remasters box set, Nuke The Whales: 2006-2014 was released by Fire on April 1, 2022. The box set, packaged in the same style as the previous box sets, features Why I Hate Women (retitled Why I Luv Women), Lady From Shanghai, Long Live Pere Ubu! and Carnival of Souls. All of the albums except Long Live Pere Ubu! were remixed by David Thomas in 2021, and Why I Luv Women and Long Live Pere Ubu! make their vinyl debuts via this set.

Style
To define their music, Pere Ubu coined the term avant-garage to reflect interest in both experimental avant-garde music (especially musique concrète) and raw, direct blues-influenced garage rock. Thomas has stated the term is "a joke invented to have something to give journalists when they yelp for a neat sound bite or pigeonhole". Their music has been called art punk and post-punk."Pere Ubu" in the Encyclopædia Britannica. Their songs imagined 1950s and 1960s garage rock and surf music archetypes as seen in a distorting funhouse mirror, emphasising the music's angst, loneliness and lyrical paranoia. Sometimes sounding like a demented nursery rhyme sing-along, this already bizarre blend was overlaid with Ravenstine's ominous EML synthesizer effects and tape looped sounds of mundane conversation, ringing telephones or steam whistles. Their propulsive rhythmic pulse was similar to Krautrock, but Thomas's yelping, howling, desperate singing was and still is peculiar when compared to most other rock and roll singers.

Personnel
Current
 David Thomas – lead vocals, keyboards, melodeon, musette, theremin (1975–82, 1987–present)
 Keith Moliné – guitar (2002, 2005–16, 2016–present)
 Gagarin (Graham Dowdall) – synthesizer, electronics (2007–16, 2016–present)
 Chris Cutler – drums, electronics (1987–90, 2004, 2019–present)
 Alex Ward - guitar, clarinet (2022-present)

Former
 Scott Krauss – drums, keyboards (1975–77, 1978–81, 1987–94)
 Allen Ravenstine – synthesizer, saxophone (1975, 1976–82, 1987–88)
 Tom Herman – guitar, bass (1975–79, 1995–98, 1998–2002, 2016)
 Tim Wright – bass, guitar (1975–76) (died 2013)
 Peter Laughner – guitar, bass (1975–76)
 Dave Taylor – synthesizer, organ (1975–76)
 Alan Greenblatt – guitar (1976)
 Tony Maimone – bass, guitar, keyboards (1976–82, 1987–93, 2003–04)
 Anton Fier – drums, marimba (1977–78, 1981–82)
 Mayo Thompson – guitar (1979–82)
 Jim Jones – guitar, keyboards (1987–94, 1994–95)
 Eric Drew Feldman – keyboards (1989–92)
 Garo Yellin – electric cello (1993–94)
 Paul Hamann – bass (1994)
 Scott Benedict – drums (1994–95)
 Wayne Kramer – guitar (1998)
 Andy Diagram – trumpet (1999, 2007)
 Sarah Jane Morris – vocals (2009)
 Steve Mehlman – drums (1995–2018)
 David Cintron – guitar  (2013)
 Darryl Boon – clarinet (2013–16, 2016–2018)
 Gary Siperko – guitar (2016–2018)
 Christoph Hahn – steel guitar (2016–2018)
 Michele Temple – bass, guitar (1993–2020)
 Robert Wheeler – synthesizer, theremin (1994–99, 1999–2007, 2009-2020)
 P.O. Jørgens - drums, percussion (2019)

Timeline

Discography
Studio albums
 The Modern Dance (1978)
 Dub Housing (1978)
 New Picnic Time (1979)
 The Art of Walking (1980)
 Song of the Bailing Man (1982)
 The Tenement Year (1988)
 Cloudland (1989)
 Worlds in Collision (1991)
 Story of My Life (1993)
 Ray Gun Suitcase (1995)
 Pennsylvania (1998)
 St. Arkansas (2002)
 Why I Hate Women (2006)
 Long Live Père Ubu! (2009, with Sarah Jane Morris)
 Lady from Shanghai (2013)
 Carnival of Souls (2014)
 20 Years in a Montana Missile Silo (2017)
 The Long Goodbye (2019)

Live albums
 390° of Simulated Stereo (1981) - Collection of live tracks recorded between 1976 and 1979
 One Man Drives While the Other Man Screams (1989) - Collection of live tracks recorded between 1978 and 1981
 Apocalypse Now (1999) - Recorded December 12, 1991 at Shuba's (Chicago/USA)
 The Shape of Things (2000) - Recorded April 7, 1976 at The Mistake (Cleveland/USA)
 London Texas (2009) - Recorded March 16, 1989 at The Mean Fiddler (London/GB)
 Live at the Longhorn (2013) - Recorded April 1, 1978 at Jay's Longhorn (Minneapolis/USA)
 The Pere Ubu Moon Unit (2015) -  Recorded November 21, 2014 at Brudenell Social Club (Leeds/GB)
 By Order of Mayor Pawlicki (2020) -  Recorded mainly July 15, 2017 at Scena Rynek Festival (Jarocin/Poland)

Digital-only live albums
 In the Shadow of the Aeronautical Shot Peening Co. (2021) - Recorded by David Thomas on a cassette at the Pirate's Cove, Old River Road, Cleveland, Ohio, on June 2, 1977.
 Manhattan 1977 (2021) - Recorded at Max's Kansas City, New York City, 1977.
 Theatre 140 (2021) - Recorded in Brussels, Belgium, on May 5, 1978. A different version was available in Datapanik in Year Zero (1996)
 On The Beach (2021) - Recorded during a private party in Bratenahl, Ohio, on July 4, 1978.
 The Avant Garage (2021) - Recorded during the 1st International Garage Exhibition, Cleveland, Ohio, on March 2, 1979.
 Robson Square Theater (2021) - Recorded in Vancouver, Canada, on June 27, 1979.
 Road to URGH! (2021) - Recorded at the Fox Warfield Theater, San Francisco, California, on August 15, 1980.
 Conde Duque, The Long Goodbye (2021) - Recorded in Madrid, Spain, on January 15, 2020.
 Walking in Bremen (2021) - Recorded at Uni-Mensa in Bremen, Germany, on February 21, 1981.
 Taking Shape (2021) - Recorded at The Mistake, Cleveland, Ohio, on April 7, 1976, or May 5, 1976 (there is some uncertainty). A different recording of the show was available in The Shape of Things (2000) live album.
 Fiddler on the Desk (2021) - Recorded at The Mean Fiddler, London, England, on March 16, 1989.
 Sidewalks in Texas (2021) - Recorded at The Mistake, Cleveland, Ohio, early 1980 (date unknown).
 On the Road to the Lost Album (2021) - Recorded at The Paradiso, Amsterdam, Netherlands, on July 14, 1981.
 Oh, Pennsylvania, I Do Remember Thee (2021) - Collection of live recordings (1998 & 2003) originally compiled by David Thomas as an aide-memoire in preparation for a Pere Ubu Tour.
 Band on the Wall (2021) - Recorded at Band on the Vall, Manchester, England, on April 18, 2013.
 MuBuC5 (2021) - Recorded during the Fall Of The Magnetic Empire Festival at The Knitting Factory, New York City, on September 13, 1996. Featuring Wayne Kramer on guitar.

Compilations
 Terminal Tower (1985) - Nonlp singles & b-sides 1975-1980
 The Hearpen Singles 1975-1977 (2016)
 Coed Jail! (2016) - A ten songs collection from the five first albums, 2 songs per album. Only sold during the Coed Jail! Tour (2016)

Box sets
 The Hearpen Singles (1995) - 45rpm box set including replicas of the four Hearpen Records singles
 Datapanik in Year Zero (1996)
 Elitism for the People 1975-1978 (2015) - Remastered vinyl box set including "The Hearpen Singles 1975-1977", "The Modern Dance", "Dub Housing" & "Manhattan", a bonus disc recorded live at Max's Kansas City (New York/USA) in 1977
 Architecture of Language 1979-1982 (2016) - Remastered vinyl box set including "New Picnic Time", "The Art Of Walking", "Song of The Bailing Man" & "Architectural Salvage", a bonus disc of nonlp singles & alternative mixes
 Drive, He Said 1994-2002 (2017) - Remastered vinyl box set including "Raygun Suitcase", "Pennsylvania", "St Arkansas" & "Back Roads", a bonus disc of songs that do not fit in the vinyl format, hidden tracks, alternative mixes & live track
 Les Haricots Sont Pas Salés 1987-1991 (2018) - Remastered vinyl box set including "The Tenement Year", "Cloudland", "Worlds In Collision" & "Songs from the Lost Album", a bonus disc of B-sides & two "Cloudland" songs that do not fit in the vinyl format

Singles and EPs
 30 Seconds Over Tokyo (b/w Heart of Darkness) (1975) - First Hearpen Records single
 Final Solution (b/w Cloud 149) (1976) - Second Hearpen Records single
 Street Waves (b/w My Dark Ages (I Don't Get Around)) (1976) - Third Hearpen Records single
 The Modern Dance (b/w Heaven) (1977) - Fourth Hearpen Records single. This single version of "The Modern Dance" is not the same mix as the subsequent album and all reissues of the track (with the railroad spike). This makes this single (with the doll squeak) the only place to find the original mix
 Datapanik in the Year Zero (1978) Maxi-single including some songs from the Hearpen singles and an unreleased track, Untitled
 The Fabulous Sequel (Have Shoes Will Walk) (b/w Humor Me (Live) and The Book Is On The Table) (1979)
 Datapanik in the Year Zero-A (Final Solution b/w My Dark Ages (I Don't Get Around)) (1980)
 Not Happy (b/w Lonesome Cowboy Dave) (1981)
 We Have the Technology (1988) - All singles between 1988 and 1991 were released in différent formats (7", 12", cd-single) with multi-b-sides
 Waiting for Mary (What Are We Doing Here) (1989)
 Love Love Love (1989)
 Breath (1989)
 I Hear They Smoke the Barbecue (1990)
 Oh Catherine (1991)
 Folly of Youth See Dee + (1995) - Enhanced CD EP
 B Each B Oys See Dee + (1996) - Enhanced CD EP
 Slow Walking Daddy (b/w Sad-TXT (live)) (2002)
 Irene (b/w Moonstruck) (2014) - Digital-only single
 Golden Surf II (b/w Throb Array)(2014) - Digital-only single
 The Radio Shall Set You Free (Dark Radio Edit) (2021) - Digital-only single

Other releases & collaborations
 Soldier-Talk (1979) - Pere Ubu (Thomas-Herman-Krauss-Ravenstine-Maimone) as a backing-band in this Mayo Thompson's Red Crayola album
 Closer to the Wall (1988) - Guest appearance by Pere Ubu (Thomas-Ravenstine-Jones-Krauss-Cutler-Maimone) on this live track of the Miracle Legion album Glad. Recorded 11/7/1987 at The Ritz Ballroom (New York City/USA)
 The Geography of Sound in the Magnetic Age (2003) - A book written in English/Italian with a bonus cd-single with two unreleased live tracks : Humor Me (1978) and Birdies (1981)
 Why I Remix Women (2006) - Songs from Why I Hate Women remixed by members of the band. This is a companion to the studio album

Charting singles

References

Further reading
Wolff, Carlo (2006). Cleveland Rock and Roll Memories''. Cleveland, OH: Gray & Company, Publishers.

External links

 
 Ubu Web: Pere Ubu's Avant Garage Online
 The story of Pere Ubu
 Ubu Projex Bandcamp – official download site for digital-only live albums
 Ubu Dance Party – French website devoted to Pere Ubu, approved by the band
 Pere Ubu on Chicago Public Radio
 David Thomas interviews about Pere Ubu on Outsight Radio Hours

 
Punk rock groups from Ohio
Musical groups from Cleveland
Musical groups established in 1975
American art rock groups
Rough Trade Records artists
American post-punk music groups
American new wave musical groups
Mercury Records artists
Chrysalis Records artists
Fontana Records artists
DGC Records artists
Radar Records artists
American industrial rock musical groups
American experimental rock groups
Cooking Vinyl artists
Musical groups from Ohio
Cherry Red Records artists
Glitterhouse Records artists
Fire Records (UK) artists
1975 establishments in Ohio